Waiopehu College is a state coeducational secondary school located in Levin, New Zealand. The school opened in February 1973 as Levin's second secondary school, after Horowhenua College struggled to cope with 1200 students. Serving Years 9 to 13 (ages 13 to 18), the school has a roll of  students as of

Notable alumni
Carlos Spencer, rugby union player and coach, All Black (1995–2004).

References

External links

Secondary schools in Manawatū-Whanganui
Educational institutions established in 1973
Levin, New Zealand
1973 establishments in New Zealand